Kevin Ullyett (born 23 May 1972) is a former professional tennis player from Zimbabwe. His primary success on the tour was in men's doubles.

Ullyett won 34 doubles titles during his career, including two Grand Slams at the 2001 US Open and the 2005 Australian Open with countryman Wayne Black. He also competed in the 2000 and 2004 Summer Olympics, coming in at fifth place in 2004 with Black. In mixed doubles, Ullyett won the 2002 Australian Open with Daniela Hantuchová. He reached the final of Wimbledon in 2002 with Hantuchová, and the semifinals there in 2003 and 2005 with Hantuchová and Liezel Huber, respectively. He and Huber were also the runners-up at the 2005 Australian Open.

Black, Ullyett's compatriot and long-time doubles partner, retired at the end of 2005. He then played with Paul Hanley for two seasons, then with Jonas Björkman, who retired at the end of 2008, and finally with Brazilian Bruno Soares.

His father, Robert Ullyett, represented Rhodesia (now Zimbabwe) in cricket and field hockey. He was part of the national team that competed at the 1964 Olympics (they beat New Zealand 2–1 and came 11th out of 15).

He made his final tennis appearance at the South African Open in February 2010 (partnering with Wesley Moodie) eighteen years after he first appeared there in 1992 competing in his first ATP Tour event. He had over 500 career wins.

He lives with his wife and two children in London. Their first child, Jemima, was born in 2005. He hopes for a career in property development after tennis.

Grand Slam finals

Doubles (2 wins)

Mixed doubles (1 win)

ATP career finals

Doubles (34–24)

Doubles performance timeline

Wins over top 10 players

Doubles
He has a  record against players who were, at the time the match was played, ranked in the top 10.

References

External links
 
 
 

1972 births
Living people
Grand Slam (tennis) champions in men's doubles
Grand Slam (tennis) champions in mixed doubles
Olympic tennis players of Zimbabwe
Sportspeople from Harare
Tennis players at the 2000 Summer Olympics
Tennis players at the 2004 Summer Olympics
White Rhodesian people
White Zimbabwean sportspeople
Zimbabwean expatriates in England
Zimbabwean male tennis players
Zimbabwean people of British descent
Australian Open (tennis) champions
US Open (tennis) champions